Bau is a district, in Kuching Division, Sarawak, Malaysia. Its seat is the town of Bau.

Towns and villages

Bau
The town of Bau houses the seat of Bau District council.

Siniawan
Siniawan started night market business in 2010.

Paku
Facilities at Paku hot springs was renovated in 2021.

Taiton
The Taiton area has range of mountains, caves, lakes and temples.

References